Amguid is a meteorite crater in Algeria.

The crater is exposed at the surface.

Crater was discovered by Europeans in 1948, first scientific description was made by Jean-Phillippe Lefranc in 1969.

See also 

 List of impact craters in Africa

References

Further reading 
 Koeberl, C., African meteorite impact craters: Characteristics and geological importance. Journal of African Earth Sciences, v. 18, pp. 263–295. 1994
 Lambert, P., McHone, J.F. Jr., Dietz, R.S. and Houfani,M., Impact and impact-like structures in Algeria. Part I. Four bowl-shaped depressions. Meteoritics, v. 15, pp. 157–179. 1980
 Lefranc, J. -P., Exploration of a meteorite crater at Amguid ( Mouydir, central Sahara). Academie des Sciences, Paris, Comptes Rendus, Serie D, v. 268, pp. 900–902. 1969
 McHone, J. F. Jr., Lambert, P., Dietz, R.S. and Briedj,M., Impact structures in Algeria (abstract). Meteoritics, v. 15, pp. 331–332. 1980

External links 

 All Africa
 Magharebia

Impact craters of Algeria
Pleistocene impact craters
Pleistocene Africa
Geography of Tamanrasset Province